A containment boom  is a temporary floating barrier used to contain an oil spill. Booms are used to reduce the possibility of polluting shorelines and other resources, and to help make recovery easier. Booms help to concentrate oil in thicker surface layers so that skimmers, vacuums, or other collection methods can be used more effectively. They come in many shapes and sizes, with various levels of effectiveness in different types of water conditions.

Often the first containment method to be used and the last equipment to be removed from the site of an oil spill, they are "the most commonly used and most environmentally acceptable response technique to clean up oil spills in the United States."

Booms used in oil spills can be seen as they rest on the surface of the water, but can have between 45 and 120 cm (18 to 48 inches) of material that hangs beneath the surface. They are effective in calm water, but as wave height increases oil or other contaminants can easily wash over the top of the boom and render them useless.

In any oil spill, the use of a single conventional boom is not effective in protecting environmental resources, even with the correct draft and aspect ratio. For speeds of over 1 knot (of the water and hence the oil), the boom will fail to stop the oil because of drainage under the boom. The approaching oil needs to be decelerated before it meets the boom. Drainage failure may be avoided by using a series of well-designed booms.

Tactics
Containment booming: placing a boom in a body of contaminated water for the purpose of holding or slowing the movement of contamination.
Diversion booming: placing a boom in a body of contaminated water for the purpose of diverting the contamination to a collection point.
Deflection booming: placing a boom in a body of water for the sole purpose of changing the course of the contamination. This method is used for contamination that is not intended to be recovered and so is not typically associated with oil spills.
Exclusion booming: placing a boom in a body of water for the purpose of blocking off a sensitive area from contamination. It is not recommended in fast water, and as diversion booming or deflection booming is better suited.  However, when diversion booming and deflection booming tactics are not suitable and resource protection is still needed, like because of a fast high tide in a sensitive estuary, an arrangement of booms with a decelerator is needed.

See also
Boom (navigational barrier)
Log boom

References

Oil spill remediation technologies